Cloghy, also spelt Cloughey or Cloughy, is a small village and townland in County Down, Northern Ireland. It lies on the east (Irish Sea) coast of the Ards Peninsula, in the Ards and North Down Borough. It had a population of 1,075 people in the 2011 Census.

Places of interest
Kirkistown Castle, an impressive tower house built in 1622 by Roland Savage. It post-dates the Plantation but is fully in the late medieval tower-house tradition. Parts of the bawn wall survive with three-quarter round flanker towers at the angles. The tower was remodelled in gothic style in 1800. The Environment and Heritage Service opened it to the public for the first time in 2001.
The nearby South and North Rocks have always been deemed two of the most deadly hazards off the coast of the Ards Peninsula. In the 25 years between 1875 and 1900, 75 boats and 29 men were lost.

Population

2001 Census
Cloghy is classified as a small village by the Northern Ireland Statistics and Research Agency (NISRA) (i.e. with population between 500 and 1,000 people). On Census day (29 April 2001) there were 752 people living in Cloghy. Of these:
20.7% were aged under 16 years and 23.7% were aged 60 and over
50.4% of the population were male and 49.6% were female
74.6% were from a Protestant background and 20.5% were from a Catholic background
2.6% of people aged 16–74 were unemployed

Sport 
The Kirkistown Circuit motor racing venue is just over a mile from the village.

References

External links
Culture Northern Ireland

Villages in County Down
Civil parish of Castleboy